The Fosdick Mountains are an east–west trending mountain range with marked serrate outlines, standing along the south side of Balchen Glacier at the head of Block Bay, in the Ford Ranges of Marie Byrd Land, Antarctica. They were discovered by the Byrd Antarctic Expedition in 1929, and named by Richard E. Byrd for Raymond B. Fosdick, who became president of the Rockefeller Foundation.

Glaciers and peaks
Balchen Glacier
Ochs Glacier
Crevasse Valley Glacier
Demas Bluff
Mount Avers
Mount Bitgood
Mount Colombo
Mount Ferranto
Mount Getz
Mount Iphigene
Mount Lockhart
Mount Luyendyk
Mount Richardson
Maigetter Peak
Mount Perkins

Geology and geography 
The dominant topography is tall, steep-sided ridges, trending north-south, with peak elevations spanning 1000 to 1200 m. The range consists of the Fosdick Metamorphic Rocks of migmatite gneiss and granite. Metamorphism occurred in the middle of the Cretaceous period. Mount Perkins is a Pleistocene volcano within the range.

Further reading 
 F. J. Korhonen, S. Saito, M. Brown, C. S. Siddoway, J. M. D. Day, Multiple Generations of Granite in the Fosdick Mountains, Marie Byrd Land, West Antarctica: Implications for Polyphase Intracrustal Differentiation in a Continental Margin Setting, Journal of Petrology, Volume 51, Issue 3, March 2010, Pages 627–670, https://doi.org/10.1093/petrology/egp0939
 Wilbanks, John Randall, Geology of the Fosdick Mountains, Marie Byrd Land, West Antarctica, http://hdl.handle.net/2346/58993
 Clarence N. Fenner, Olivine fourchites from Raymond Fosdick Mountains, Antarctica, GSA Bulletin (1938) 49 (3): 367–400. https://doi.org/10.1130/GSAB-49-367 
 Smith, Christine Helen, Cordierite gneisses and high temperature metamorphisms in the Fosdick Mountains, west Antarctica, with implications for breakup processes in the Pacific sector of the Mesozoic Gondwana margin, University of California, Santa Barbara
 Richard, S. M., Smith, C. H., Kimbrough, D. L., Fitzgerald, P. G., Luyendyk, B. P., & McWilliams, M. O. (1994), Cooling history of the northern Ford Ranges, Marie Byrd Land, West Antarctica, Tectonics, 13(4), 837-857

References

External links 

 Fosdick Mountains on USGS website
 Fosdick Mountains on SCAR website
 Fosdick Mountains geological map
 Fosdick Mountains satellite image

Mountains of Antarctica
Marie Byrd Land
Ford Ranges